Phyllis Smith (born 1951) is an American actress.

Phyllis Smith or Phylis Smith may also refer to:

 Phyllis Curtin (1921–2016), née Phyllis Smith, American classical soprano
 Phylis Smith (born 1965), British Olympic sprinter and bronze medallist